
Gmina Puszcza Mariańska is a rural gmina (administrative district) in Żyrardów County, Masovian Voivodeship, in east-central Poland.

The gmina contains part of the protected area called Bolimów Landscape Park.

Villages
Gmina Puszcza Mariańska contains the villages and settlements of Aleksandria, Bartniki, Bednary, Biernik, Budy Wolskie, Budy Zaklasztorne, Budy-Kałki, Długokąty, Długokąty Małe, Emilianów, Górki, Grabina Radziwiłłowska, Huta Partacka, Kamion, Karnice, Korabiewice, Lisowola, Marianów, Michałów, Mrozy, Niemieryczew, Nowa Huta, Nowy Karolinów, Nowy Łajszczew, Olszanka, Pniowe, Puszcza Mariańska, Radziwiłłów, Sapy, Stara Huta, Stary Karolinów, Stary Łajszczew, Studzieniec, Waleriany, Wilczynek, Wincentów, Wola Polska, Wycześniak, Wygoda and Zator.

Neighbouring gminas
Gmina Puszcza Mariańska is bordered by the town of Żyrardów and by the gminas of Bolimów, Kowiesy, Mszczonów, Nowy Kawęczyn, Radziejowice, Skierniewice and Wiskitki.

References
Polish official population figures 2006

Puszcza Marianska
Żyrardów County